Venus Zine was a quarterly internationally circulated magazine covering women in music, film, art, entertainment, literature, fashion, indie culture and DIY culture. It was published from 1995 through 2010.

Venuszine.com was the daily updated online companion to the magazine. Venus Zine and venuszine.com featured interviews with artists including Yoko Ono, Patti Smith, and Kim Deal in addition to edgy and up-and-coming musicians, designers, writers, actresses, and DIY entrepreneurs.

History 
Venus Zine, headquartered in Chicago, Illinois, was founded in East Lansing, Michigan, in the Michigan State University dorm room of Amy Schroeder in 1995. It began as a photocopied, black and white, stapled fanzine but over the years grew into a full-size glossy publication. In 2006, it was bought by two magazine publishers, Anne Hartnett and Marci Sepulveda, who also publish Chicago Agent magazine. The magazine covered music, fashion, and culture. The readership is both male and female, but most articles are written by women.

In April 2010, the magazine was relaunched under new ownership of Sarah Beardsley who acquired the publication in February. In December 2010, the publication ended its print run and laid off all staff members.

Articles of note 
In response to a 2003 article by Rolling Stone titled "The 100 Greatest Guitarists of All Time", which included only two female guitarists, Venus Zine published their own "Greatest Female Guitarists Of All Time" list. Put together through nominations by experts Abigail Aronson Zocher, Kenneth Bays, Calvin Johnson,  Evelyn McDonnell, Amy Phillips, Jaan Uhelszki, and Nan Warshaw, the list features the 46 women deemed worthy of being called the greatest including: Joan Jett, Odetta, Carrie Brownstein, Memphis Minnie and Chrissie Hynde.

The list has been mentioned and discussed by such web publications as Chicagoist and Gaper's Block.

Past issues

Press
 In 2007, Venus Zine was named one of the Chicago Tribune's "50 Favorite Magazines."

References

External links
Venus Zine Official Site (defunct)

Entertainment magazines published in the United States
Music magazines published in the United States
Quarterly magazines published in the United States
Defunct women's magazines published in the United States
Magazines established in 1995
Magazines disestablished in 2010
Magazines published in Chicago